The Association for Women in Communications (AWC) is an American professional organization for women in the communications industry.

History

Theta Sigma Phi
The Association for Women in Communications began in 1909 as Theta Sigma Phi, an honorary society at the University of Washington.  It was founded by seven female students at the University of Washington in Seattle who had entered the college's new journalism program, the second of its kind in the country. By 1915, there were Theta Sigma Phi chapters at the universities of Indiana, Wisconsin, Missouri, Kansas, Oklahoma, Oregon and Ohio State University. Officers from the Washington Chapter still doubled as national officers, and the organization began publishing The Matrix, a Magazine for Women Journalists.

In 1918, Theta Sigma Phi held its first convention at the University of Kansas. A year later, women in Kansas City founded the first alumnae chapter (now known as professional chapters), followed by women in Des Moines and Indianapolis.

World War I brought more women into newspaper jobs as their male colleagues went to battle. Theta Sigma Phi member Alice Rohe was a United Press reporter in Rome; Bessie Beatty of the San Francisco Bulletin and Sigrid Schultz of the Chicago Tribune reported from Germany as the war ended. But in the postwar economic slump, hostility against "women in men's jobs" ran high. Many editors relegated women to society pages instead of "hard news".

Although women gained the right to vote in 1920, support lagged for other reforms. Ruby Black, who was national president, editor of The Matrix and the first manager of an employment bureau for members, noted in 1931 that female journalists could not get reporting jobs at the same pay as similarly qualified men.

Theta Sigma Phi strengthened as a national network during the 1930s. The association hired a professional director and founded a national office in 1934. It inaugurated the Headliner Awards in 1939 to honor members who had made outstanding contributions to the field. The group gave Eleanor Roosevelt honorary membership for her efforts to aid female communicators. The First Lady's most notable action was to close her news conferences to male reporters. Roosevelt contributed several articles to The Matrix.

By 1940, Theta Sigma Phi had 39 chapters, and World War II was expanding opportunities for women. But inequality persisted, and women were regarded as temporary or less-serious workers. At the Theta Sigma Phi convention in 1946, delegates required all chapters to eliminate any race restrictions from their bylaws.

By 1950, the group had grown to 47 campus chapters and 29 alumnae groups as more women began to work.

In 1964, Theta Sigma Phi established its headquarters in Austin, Texas. Jo Caldwell Meyer retired after serving as executive secretary for 24 years, leaving a legacy of leadership and personal attention to members' needs.

Women in Communications
In 1972, Theta Sigma Phi was renamed to Women in Communications, Inc. (WICI). That year, the organization also voted to admit men into membership.

In 1973, Women in Communications created an awards program (later named the Clarion Awards) to recognize excellence in communications. A new monthly, National Newsletter joined The Matrix in recording the group's news. WICI joined the national ERA coalition to fight the mounting opposition to the Equal Rights Amendment.

In 1979, WICI united with 11 communications organizations to found the First Amendment Congress, which works to preserve First Amendment rights.

WICI increasingly defended the freedoms of speech and the press. Leaders protested the news blackout during the invasion of Grenada and spoke out to Congress against proposed changes to the Freedom of Information Act. More than 100 chapters organized congressional letter-writing campaigns. WICI joined the National Committee on Pay Equity and awarded Rep. Mary Rose Oakar of Ohio an honorary membership because of her leadership on the issue.

In early 1988, the WICI Board of Directors moved the group's headquarters to Arlington, Va., just outside Washington, DC, to be closer to the seat of government.

Membership peaked in the mid-1980s at around 13,000, and by 1995 the organization had around 8,000 members and significant debt.

WICI leaders instituted the Rising Star Award in 1990 for outstanding student members. Laura Glad, of California State University at Fullerton, was the first recipient.  WICI delegates voiced support for the Civil Rights Act, which President Bush signed in 1991, and the Family and Medical Leave Act, which President Clinton signed in 1993. The end of the year saw a new partnership emerge between WICI and Capital Cities/ABC Inc. on its "Stop Sexual Harassment" campaign.

Association for Women in Communications
In 1996 WICI was dissolved, and the organization was renamed to the Association for Women in Communications. At that time, management of the organization was handed to a management firm, and finances stabilized under the new board and organization. The current firm is Club Management Services in Springfield, Missouri. The nonprofit AWC Matrix Foundation was established in 1998 as the educational affiliate.

The mission of the AWC Matrix Foundation, founded in 1997, is to promote the advancement of women in the communications profession by providing funds for education, research and publications. It carries out its educational and charitable goals in cooperation with the Association for Women in Communications.

Three Matrix Foundation initiatives are:
Professional Certification Program recognizes excellence in all areas of communications; provides an opportunity to demonstrate communication and management skills and enhance employment/client potential.
Edith Wortman First Amendment Award honors professional communicators for their efforts relating to First Amendment issues.
Barbara Erickson Scholarship Fund gives college students an opportunity to meet and mingle with professional communicators by funding attendance at the AWC National Professional Conference.

Chapters
The chapters of Theta Sigma Phi as of 1968 were:

Conventions
10th Biennial - August 18–20, 1938 - Biltmore Hotel, Los Angeles.

Awards

 The Clarion Award
 The International Matrix Award (since 1970)
 The Headliner Award (since 1939)

Notable members
 Shirley Abrahamson (1987 Headliner Award Recipient)
 Myrna Blyth (1992 Headliner Award Recipient)
 Rita Cosby (2002 Headliner Award Recipient)
 Edna Ferber (Honorary)
 Genevieve Forbes (Honorary)
 Zona Gale (Honorary)
 Dana Gatlin (Honorary)
 Heloise (columnist) (1994 Headliner Award Recipient)
 Julilly House Kohler 
 Sophia Kerr (Honorary)
 Margaret Larson (2004 Headliner Award Recipient)
 Gini Laurie (1987 Headliner Award Recipient)
 Harriet Monroe (Honorary)
 Marjorie Paxson (president 1963—1967, 1975 Headliner Award recipient, 2001 Lifetime Achievement Award recipient, 2003 Hall of Fame inductee)
 Margot Sherman Peet (president 19xx-19xx), SVP McCann-Erickson
 Jeanine Pirro (1998 Headliner Award Recipient)
 Eleanor Roosevelt (honorary member, 1934)
 Gail Sheehy (2000 Headliner Award Recipient)
 Barbara Sher (1998 Headliner Award Recipient)
 Sara Teasdale (Honorary)
 Ida M. Tarbell (Honorary)
 Barbara Walters (1994 Headliner Award Recipient)
 Ella Wheeler Wilcox (Honorary)
 Mary Alice Williams (1986 Headliner Award Recipient)
 Honore Willsie (Honorary)

Publications
 1915-, The Matrix, a Magazine for Women Journalists (currently replaced by Communiqué, an electronic newsletter)

References

External links
 
 AWC Matrix Foundation official site
 WOMEN IN COMMUNICATIONS, INC. RECORDS, 1915- from the Indiana Historical Society
 Preliminary Guide to the Association for Women in Communications Records 1909-2009 from the University of Washington Libraries Special Collections

Women's organizations based in the United States
Organizations for women in business
Student organizations established in 1909
1909 establishments in Washington (state)